Okenia elegans, the yellow skirt slug, is a species of a sea slug, specifically a dorid nudibranch, a marine gastropod mollusc in the family Goniodorididae. It is the type species of its genus.

Distribution
This species was described from near Sète on the Mediterranean Sea coast of France. It is reported from the adjacent Atlantic Ocean as far north as Scotland.

References

External links 
 
 
 

Goniodorididae
Gastropods described in 1828